The 1991–92 FA Cup Qualifying Rounds opened the 111th season of competition in England for 'The Football Association Challenge Cup' (FA Cup), the world's oldest association football single knockout competition.  A total of 558 clubs were accepted for the competition, down five from the previous season’s 563.

The large number of clubs entering the tournament from lower down (Levels 5 through 8) in the English football pyramid meant that the competition started with five rounds of preliminary (1) and qualifying (4) knockouts for these non-League teams.  The 28 winning teams from Fourth Round Qualifying progressed to the First Round Proper, where League teams tiered at Levels 3 and 4 entered the competition.

Calendar

Preliminary round

Ties

Replays

2nd replays

1st qualifying round

Ties

Replays

2nd replay

2nd qualifying round

Ties

Replays

2nd replays

3rd qualifying round

Ties

Replays

4th qualifying round
The teams that given byes to this round are Colchester United, Altrincham, Telford United, Runcorn, Merthyr Tydfil, Barrow, Welling United, Yeovil Town, Stafford Rangers, Farnborough Town, Witton Albion, Leek Town, Sutton United, Aylesbury United, Halesowen Town, Hayes, Bishop Auckland, Whitley Bay, Atherstone United and Chorley.

Ties

Replays

2nd replay

1991–92 FA Cup
See 1991-92 FA Cup for details of the rounds from the First Round Proper onwards.

External links
 Football Club History Database: FA Cup 1991–92
 The FA Cup Archive

Qual
FA Cup qualifying rounds